Stocking Lake is a lake in Wadena County, in the U.S. state of Minnesota.

Stocking Lake was so named on account of its outline being shaped roughly like a stocking.

See also
List of lakes in Minnesota

References

Lakes of Minnesota
Lakes of Wadena County, Minnesota